General elections took place in Curaçao on 19 March 2021, two days after the 2021 Dutch general election.

Electoral system 
The 21 members of the Estates are elected by proportional representation. Parties that won at least one seat in the 2017 election were allowed to participate automatically and a primary election was held to determine which non-parliamentary parties could run. In the primary, these parties were required to win the equivalent of 1% of the votes cast in the previous general election in order to participate.

Primary election 
In Curaçao, parties with no parliamentary representation must compete in a primary, and must receive an equivalent of at least 1% of the total number of votes present in the prior election (in 2017) to participate in the general election. The primary was held on 30 and 31 January. The threshold to advance was 789 votes.

Campaign period
On 7 March, the fourth candidate on the list of the Trabou pa Kòrsou (Work for Curaçao) party, Almier Godett, was shot and killed while trying to calm a family dispute.

Results

References

Elections in Curaçao
2021 in Curaçao
Curaçao